Beyeler is a surname. Notable people with the surname include:

Andreas Beyeler (born 1942), Swiss former sports shooter 
Arnie Beyeler (born 1964), American professional baseball coach, former player and manager
Ernst Beyeler (1921–2010), Swiss art dealer and collector
Fred Beyeler (born 1965), New Zealand cricketer
Irene Beyeler (born 1985), Swiss sport shooter
Otto Beyeler (1926–2004), Swiss cross country skier
Simon Beyeler (born 1982), Swiss sport shooter